Smedsby is a village in Korsholm in Finland

External links
Smedsby in Google maps

Korsholm
Villages in Finland